Places named Madisonville in the United States include:

 Madisonville, Kentucky
 Madisonville, Louisiana
 Madisonville, a former town near Madison, Mississippi
 Madisonville, Missouri
 Madisonville, Cincinnati, Ohio
 Madisonville, Tennessee
 Madisonville, Texas

See also
Nuka Hiva, which had a short-lived American settlement called Madisonville